Stemple may refer to:
Adam Stemple, an American musician
Stemple Creek, a stream in California
Lisa Stemple, a character in the sitcom Mad About You

See also 
 Stempel